Charles Victor Pyle Jr. (December 24, 1934 – June 2, 2017) was an American judge and politician. He served as a member of the South Carolina House of Representatives.

Life and career 
Pyle attended Greenville High School and the University of South Carolina.

In 1968, Pyle was elected to the South Carolina House of Representatives, representing Greenville County, South Carolina. In 1976, he was elected to serve as a judge for the Greenville County Court, serving until 1979, when he was elected to the Thirteenth Judicial Court, serving until 2000.

Pyle died in June 2017, at the age of 82.

References 

Members of the South Carolina House of Representatives
1934 births
2017 deaths
20th-century American politicians
University of South Carolina alumni
South Carolina state court judges
20th-century American judges